The Trial is a 1993 film made by the British Broadcasting Corporation (BBC) based on Harold Pinter's screenplay adaptation of Franz Kafka's 1925 novel The Trial.

Directed by David Jones and produced by Jan Balzer and Louis Marks, the film stars Kyle MacLachlan and has cameo appearances by several prominent British actors including Anthony Hopkins, Juliet Stevenson, Alfred Molina, David Thewlis, and Michael Kitchen.

Cast

Production

The film was shot in Prague and Kutná Hora.

Reception
The film grossed £58,000 in the United Kingdom. In the United States and Canada it grossed $119,267.

See also 
 The Trial, 1962 film directed by Orson Welles.

References

External links 

1993 films
1993 drama films
Films about lawyers
Films based on Czech novels
Films based on works by Franz Kafka
Films directed by David Jones
Films scored by Carl Davis
Films with screenplays by Harold Pinter
British courtroom films
Films shot in the Czech Republic
British drama films
Dystopian films
1990s English-language films
1990s British films